District Jail Multan is an old district jail in Multan, Pakistan.

In 2021, Chief Minister of Punjab, Pakistan had some of their budget money allocated in their development package for Multan for the relocation of this old jail to a new location.

See also
 Government of Punjab, Pakistan
 Punjab Prisons (Pakistan)
 Prison Officer
 Headquarter Jail
 National Academy for Prisons Administration

References

Prisons in Pakistan
Multan District